The men's regu (team) seni competition at the 2018 Asian Games took place on 27 August 2018 at Padepokan Pencak Silat, Taman Mini Indonesia Indah, Jakarta, Indonesia.

Schedule
All times are Western Indonesia Time (UTC+07:00)

Results

References

External links
Official website

Men's regu